Colin Watkinson is an English cinematographer. He won the Primetime Emmy Award for Outstanding Cinematography for a Single-Camera Series (One Hour) for "Offred", the pilot episode of The Handmaid's Tale, and was nominated in the same category for subsequent series. He was director of photographer for Tarsem Singh's The Fall in 2006.

Filmography

TV series
 The Handmaid's Tale (2017–present) – also director of 3 episodes

Movies
 The Fall (2006) – Best Cinematography, Austin Film Critics Association 2008
 Off The Rails (2018)
 Luckiest Girl Alive (2022)

References

External links
 
 

English cinematographers
Living people
Year of birth missing (living people)